Rabbi Yitzchak Isaac Taub (1751–7th of Adar 2, March 21, 1821) was the rabbi of Nagykálló (in Yiddish Kalov), Hungary and the first Hassidic Rebbe in Hungary. He was known as "the Sweet Singer of Israel".  He composed many popular Hasidic melodies. He was famous for composing the traditional Hungarian Hasidic tune "Szól a kakas már".

Biography 
His exact place of birth is uncertain, most probably he was born either in Nagykálló or Szerencs. Rabbi Taub was discovered by Rabbi Leib Sarah's, a disciple of the Baal Shem Tov. Rabbi Leib first met Rabbi Isaac when he was a small child, a small shepherd boy. Rabbi Leib told his mother, a widow, that her son was destined to be a great Tzadik. He took the small child to Nikolsburg to learn with Rabbi Shmelke of Nikolsburg. Rabbi Isaac grew to be a great Rebbe and was known as "the Sweet Singer of Israel".

Songs 
He composed many popular Hasidic Nigunim (melodies). Often he adapted Hungarian folk songs, adding Jewish words, by that transforming it to sacred songs. He taught that the tunes he heard were really from the Holy Temple in Jerusalem, and were lost among the nations over the years, and he found them and returned them to the Jewish people. He said that the proof that it was true was that the gentile who would teach him the song would forget it as soon as the rebbe learned it. He was famous for composing the traditional Hungarian Hasidic tune Szól a kakas már.

 Words in square brackets are sometimes omitted. See Hungarian phonology about proper pronunciation.

When Leib Sarah's found him, he sang in Hungarian a song he knew from the shepherds, Erdő, erdő, which he adapted to Judaism by changing the words. In Yitzack Isaac's version, the love in the song is for the Shechina (Divine Presence) that is in exile until the Messiah:
Forest, O forest, how vast are you!
Rose, O rose, how distant you are!
Were the forest not so vast,
My rose wouldn't be so far.
Who will guide me out of the forest,
And unite me with my rose?
Then he sang it as Rabbi Leib Sarah's heard it.

Exile, O exile, how vast are you!
Shechinah, Shechinah, how distant you are!
Were the exile not so vast,
The Shechinah wouldn't be so far.
Who will guide me out of the exile,
And unite me with the Shechinah?

Another famous song by the Kaliver Rebbe is Sírnak, rínak a bárányok – also in Hungarian.

References 

Hasidic rebbes